The women's individual time trial was one of 4 cycling events of the 2018 Mediterranean Games. The event started and finished on 30 June at the Vila-seca Urban Circuit.

Results

References

Women's road time trial
2018 in women's road cycling